Yahoo! Music was a brand under which Yahoo! provided a variety of music services, including Internet radio, music videos, news, artist information, and original programming. Previously, users with Yahoo! accounts could gain access to hundreds of thousands of songs sorted by artist, album, song and genre.

History

Yahoo Music began as "LAUNCH", a website and magazine produced by LAUNCH Media which Yahoo acquired for US$12 million in 2001. LAUNCH was later rebranded as "Yahoo Music", then simply "Y! Music" in February 2005.  LAUNCH's LAUNCHcast Internet radio and music video offerings were integrated into Yahoo's site along with artist profiles containing an extensive selection of music and biographical information.

On September 14, 2004, Yahoo purchased Musicmatch, Inc., makers of the Musicmatch Jukebox software. As of Musicmatch 10.1, Yahoo has rebranded Musicmatch Jukebox as Yahoo Music Musicmatch Jukebox, and integrated it with the Yahoo Music Engine store. The main difference is the branding and physical program.

In 2005, Yahoo Music became the first major online music service to provide a $5 per month unlimited download service similar to the Open Music Model, albeit with digital rights management, called Yahoo! Music Unlimited.

Yahoo Music was the number one online music site in terms of audience reach and total time spent in March 2007.

In 2008, Yahoo announced that Yahoo Music Unlimited will be merged into Rhapsody. This merge was completed with the shutdown of Yahoo Music Unlimited on September 30, 2008.

In 2011, Yahoo Music became the main CBS Radio player, with its rival AOL Radio switching to Slacker Radio. A year later, Yahoo would switch to iHeartRadio as its music service.

As of September 2018, Yahoo! Music's site has been consolidated into Yahoo! Entertainment's site and all Yahoo! Music's URLs redirect to Yahoo! Entertainment with its own "Music" section.

Services
Yahoo Music offered a variety of services, including:
 Artist profiles, music videos and lyrics
 Live Sets – video concerts from A-list artists
 Official Grammy Awards coverage
 Pepsi Smash on Yahoo Music – video interviews, performances, and reality segments
 Play – music identifier
 Who's Next – Listeners' vote on emerging artists
 Yahoo! Music Jukebox
 Yahoo! Music Radio (formerly LAUNCHcast; content provided by iHeartRadio) and LAUNCHcast Plus Internet radio (until February 2009)
 Yahoo! Music Unlimited subscription streaming and download service

References

External links
 

Music
American music websites
Music
Internet properties established in 2001
Internet properties disestablished in 2018